Amit Sharma may refer to:
 Amit Sharma (cricketer)
 Amit Sharma (director)
 Amit Prakash Sharma, Indian parasitologist